Statistics of League of Ireland in the 1962/1963 season.

Overview
It was contested by 10 teams, and Dundalk won the championship.

Final classification

Drogheda and Sligo Rovers were elected to the league for next season.

Results

Top scorers

League of Ireland seasons
Ireland
1962–63 in Republic of Ireland association football